The 1976 Austrian motorcycle Grand Prix was the second round of the 1976 Grand Prix motorcycle racing season. It took place on 2 May 1976 at the Salzburgring circuit.

500cc classification

Footnotes

350 cc classification

125 cc classification

Sidecar classification

References

Austrian motorcycle Grand Prix
Austrian
Motorcycle Grand Prix
Austrian Motorcycle Grand Prix